Short Pump may refer to:

Short Pump Middle School, a Middle School in Virginia
Short Pump Elementary School, an Elementary School in Virginia
Short Pump Town Center, an outdoor mall In Virginia
Short Pump, Virginia, a town in Virginia